Robert Simpson (born 1956 or 1957) is a former MLA for Cariboo North in the Canadian province of British Columbia. He was elected to the Legislative Assembly in the 2005 election.

He was a member of the British Columbia New Democratic Party. He was removed from caucus on October 7, 2010, for public dissent regarding Carole James, former leader of the New Democratic Party of British Columbia, and subsequently sat in the legislature as an Independent MLA.

On February 7, 2013, Simpson joined with Delta South MLA Vicki Huntington and Abbotsford South MLA John van Dongen to present a six-point agenda for democratic reform, including changes to B.C.'s electoral finance law and the Election Act.

Simpson announced on June 20, 2014 that he would run for Mayor of Quesnel, British Columbia, and he held the position until October 15, 2022, when he lost to Ron Paull.

Electoral record

|-
 
|NDP
|Bob Simpson
|align="right"|7004
|align="right"|49.51
|align="right"| +2.12
|align="right"|$53,378

|- bgcolor="white"
!align="left" colspan=3|Total
!align="right"|14,148
!align="right"|
!align="right"|
|- bgcolor="white"
!align="right" colspan=3|Total rejected ballots
!align="right"|87
!align="right"|0.61%
!align="right"|
|- bgcolor="white"
!align="right" colspan=3|Turnout
!align="right"|14,235
!align="right"|60.24%
!align="right"|
|}

|-

|NDP
|Bob Simpson
|align="right"|7,353
|align="right"|47.28%
|align="right"|
|align="right"|$45,906

|-

|- bgcolor="white"
!align="right" colspan=3|Total valid votes
!align="right"|15,553
!align="right"|100%
!align="right"|
|- bgcolor="white"
!align="right" colspan=3|Total rejected ballots
!align="right"|126
!align="right"|0.81%
!align="right"|
|- bgcolor="white"
!align="right" colspan=3|Turnout
!align="right"|15,679
!align="right"|64.26%
!align="right"|

References

External links
 Bob Simpson

Year of birth missing (living people)
Living people
Independent MLAs in British Columbia
British Columbia New Democratic Party MLAs
Scottish emigrants to Canada
1950s births
21st-century Canadian politicians